Bartholomäus Gesius (also: Göß, Gese,  – 1613) was a German theologian, church musician, composer and hymn writer. He worked at Schloss Muskau and in Frankfurt (Oder) and is known for choral Passions in German and Latin and for the melody and first setting of the Easter hymn "Heut triumphieret Gottes Sohn", which was used in several compositions including a cantata by Dieterich Buxtehude and a chorale prelude by Johann Sebastian Bach (BWV 630), concluding the Easter section of his Orgelbüchlein.

Life 

Born in Müncheberg, Gesius studied theology between 1578 and 1585 at the Alma Mater Viadrina in Frankfurt (Oder). He worked from 1582 as Kantor (church musician) in Müncheberg and from 1587 as teacher and musician at Schloss Muskau (now a World Heritage Site). In 1588, he began to compose a Passion after the Gospel of John in German, a St John Passion for five-part chorus. In spring of 1593, Gesius became Kantor at the Marienkirche, Frankfurt (Oder) and at the same time teacher at the Ratsschule, today the Karl-Liebknecht-Gymnasium. In 1613, he composed a six-part St Matthew Passion in Latin. He died the same year in Frankfurt (Oder) from the plague.

"Heut triumphieret Gottes Sohn" 

Gesius wrote the melody and first five-part setting for the Easter hymn "Heut triumphieret Gottes Sohn" ("This Day in Triumph God the Son") on a text attributed to Kaspar Stolzhagen. The text of originally sixteen stanzas of six lines each repeats "Halleluja, Halleluja" as every third and sixth line. The melody is in 6/4 time and rises on every first mentioning of Halleluja. It was published in his Geistliche deutsche Lieder (Spiritual German songs) in 1601. It appeared in seventeen hymnals. In the current German Protestant hymnal Evangelisches Gesangbuch, it is number 109.

Instrumental and vocal compositions have been based on the hymn, including a cantata by Dieterich Buxtehude, BuxWV 43, which sets the text of the first stanza, and a chorale prelude by Johann Sebastian Bach (BWV 630), concluding the Easter section of his Orgelbüchlein.

Selected works 
 Geistliche Deutsche Lieder. D. Mart. Lutheri: Und anderer frommen Christen: Welche durchs gantze Jahr in der Christlichen Kirchen zusingen gebreuchlich/ mit vier und fünff Stimmen …  Frankfurt an der Oder: Hartman, 1601
 Enchiridium etlicher deutscher und lateinischer Gesänge. Frankfurt an der Oder: Hartman, 1603
 Hymni Patrum Cum Canticis Sacris, Latinis Et Germanicis, De Praecipuis Festis Anniversariis: Quibus Additi Suntet Hymni Scholastici Ad Duodecim Modos Musicos in utroq[ue] cantu, Regulari scilicet ac Transposito, singulis horis per totam septimanam decantandi, cum cantionibus Gregorianis … Frankfurt an der Oder: Hartman, 1609

Literature 

 Paul Blumenthal: Der Kantor Bartholomäus Gesius zu Frankfurt-Oder Frankfurt/Oder: Vogel & Neuber 1926 (Frankfurt und die Ostmark; vol. 1)
 Siegfried Gissel: Untersuchungen zur mehrstimmigen protestantischen Hymnenkomposition in Deutschland um 1600. Kassel; Basel; London: Bärenreiter (University of Marburg dissertation) 1980 
 
 Friedrich Wilhelm Schönherr: Bartholomaeus Gesius (Munchbergensis ca. 1560–1613): Ein Beitrag zur Musikgeschichte der Stadt Frankfurt a/O. im 16. Jahrhundert. Leipzig, Phil. Diss., 1920

References

External links 
 
 
 

16th-century German composers
17th-century German composers
Renaissance composers
German Protestant hymnwriters
1560s births
1613 deaths
Year of birth uncertain